The Shire of Woodanilling is a local government area in the Great Southern region of Western Australia, about  south of Wagin and about  south-southeast of the state capital, Perth.

History
The Woodanilling Road District was established on 2 February 1906. On 1 July 1961, it became a Shire under the Local Government Act 1960, which reformed all road districts into shires.

Wards
The shire is divided into 3 wards:

 Central Ward (2 councillors)
 West Ward (3 councillors)
 East Ward (2 councillors)

Towns and localities
The towns and localities of the Shire of Woodanilling with population and size figures based on the most recent Australian census:

Population
Historical population of the shire:

Heritage-listed places

As of 2023, 224 places are heritage-listed in the Shire of Woodanilling, of which one is on the State Register of Heritage Places, the Carrolup Aboriginal Cemetery in Marribank. The cemetery is part of the also state heritage listed Carrolup Native Settlement, which was state heritage listed on 22 May 2007 but is predominantly located in the neighbouring Shire of Kojonup.

References

External links
 

Woodanilling